Francisco Santos García de Ontiveros y Martínez (died 28 June 1596) was a Roman Catholic prelate who served as Bishop of Guadalajara (1592–1596).

Biography
On 22 May 1592, Francisco Santos García de Ontiveros y Martínez was selected by the King of Spain and confirmed by Pope Clement VIII as Bishop of Guadalajara. On 3 October 1593, he was consecrated bishop by Diego de Romano y Govea, Bishop of Tlaxcala, and on 6 November 1593, he was installed to the bishopric. He served as Bishop of Guadalajara until his death on 28 June 1596.

References

External links and additional sources
 (for Chronology of Bishops)
 (for Chronology of Bishops)

1596 deaths
16th-century Roman Catholic bishops in Mexico
Bishops appointed by Pope Clement VIII